William Pye may refer to:

 William S. Pye (1880–1959), US Navy admiral
 William George Pye (1869–1949), English businessman
 William Pye (priest) (died 1557), English priest
 William Pye (sculptor) (born 1938), British sculptor

See also
 William Pye Baddeley